Yeliz is a common feminine Turkish given name. In Turkish, "Yeliz" means "beautiful", "luminous", "brightly", and/or "spacious".

Given name
 Huriye Yeliz Yüksel (born 1984), Turkish ice hockey player and coach
 Yeliz Yakar (born 1977), Turkish / Dutch fashion designer, founder of yyakar, www.yyakar.com
 Yeliz Açar (born 1997), Turkish women's footballer
 Yeliz Ay (born 1977), Turkish racewalker
 Yeliz Başa (born 1987), Turkish volleyball player
 Yeliz Fındık (born 1976), Turkish martial artist
 Yeliz Kurt (born 1984), Turkish middle distance runner
 Yeliz Kuvancı (born 1985), Turkish actress 
 Yeliz Özel (born 1980), Turkish handball player
 Yeliz Topaloğlu (born 1978), Turkish football referee
 Yeliz Yılmaz (born 1980), Turkish handball player

Turkish feminine given names